Alexander Leeper (3 June 1848 – 6 August 1934), was an Australian educator.

Alexander Leeper, the son of the Rev. Alexander Leeper, canon of St Patrick's Cathedral, Dublin, was born on 3 June 1848. He was educated at Trinity College Dublin, where he graduated B.A. in 1871 and M.A. in 1875, and St John's College, Oxford where he took a first-class BA in Literae Humaniores in 1874.

Leeper came to Victoria in 1875 as classical master for the Melbourne Church of England Grammar School but in the following year was made principal of Trinity College (University of Melbourne). The title of his office was afterwards changed to warden. He was not completely successful from the beginning, at one stage there was a revolt which ended in the expulsion of several students, but it became recognized that Leeper was devoted to the college, which he controlled with success for the remainder of his 42 years of office.

Leeper also took an important share in the management of the university as a member of the council from 1880 to 1887 and 1900 to 1923. He resigned his position as warden of Trinity in 1918, but continued to be a prominent figure in Melbourne for many years longer as a member of the council of education, as a lay canon of St Paul's Cathedral, Melbourne, and as a trustee of the public library, museums and National Gallery of Victoria of which he was president from 1920 to 1928. He was also a leading spirit in the Melbourne Shakespeare Society and the Classical Association. He was a great fighter on the North of Ireland side in all controversies relating to Irish questions. He died at Melbourne on 6 August 1934. An excellent portrait by John Longstaff is in the National Gallery of Victoria at Melbourne.

Beyond some lectures and pamphlets, his only publication was his translation of Thirteen Satires of Juvenal, originally prepared in conjunction with Herbert Augustus Strong in 1882, but afterwards revised and issued under his own name. Trinity College, Dublin, gave him the degree of LL.D. The first Latin play and the first Greek tragedy to be performed in Australia were produced under his direction at Trinity College, Melbourne. Five of his students became bishops in the Anglican Church: J. Stretch and George Merrick Long (Newcastle, Australia), R. Stephen (Hobart), T. H. Armstrong (Wangaratta) and W. C. Sadlier (Nelson, New Zealand).

Personal life

He was married twice, first to Adeline Marian, daughter of Sir George Wigram Allen and later to Mary Elizabeth, daughter of F. G. Moule, who survived him with three sons and four daughters. Two of the sons had distinguished careers: the elder, Alexander Wigram Allen Leeper (1887-1935), born at Melbourne and educated at Melbourne Grammar School, the University of Melbourne and at Oxford, eventually entered the British Foreign Office and rose to be the first secretary at H.M. legation at Vienna 1924–8, and counsellor 1933. He broke down under the strain of his work in 1934 and died in January 1935. He had nearly completed A History of Medieval Austria, which was published by the Oxford University Press in 1941. His brother, Reginald Wildig Allen Leeper, born at Sydney in 1888 and educated at Melbourne Grammar School and the universities of Melbourne and Oxford, also entered the foreign office and diplomatic service. He was the first secretary at Warsaw, 1923–4; Riga, 1924; Constantinople, 1925; Warsaw, 1927–9; counsellor, 1933; C.M.G., 1936; assistant under-secretary, 1940; ambassador at the court of the King of the Hellenes, 1943; K.C.M.G. 1945; ambassador to the Argentine Republic, 1946.

Valentine Leeper, Leeper's eldest child by his second marriage, became a classicist, teacher, polemicist (like her father), and letter-writer of renown.

Footnotes

References

 John Poynter, Doubts and Certainties: A life of Alexander Leeper, Melbourne University Press, 1997.
Trinity College Website

External links
 

1848 births
1934 deaths
Alumni of Trinity College Dublin
Alumni of St John's College, Oxford
Australian educators